Strážne is a village located in Trebišov District the Košice Region in Slovakia - some 353 km east of Bratislava, the country's capital.

Formerly a part of Hungary, there are more ethnic Hungarians located in Strážne than Slovaks despite it being Slovak territory - 596 Hungarians to 51 Slovaks - and being part of many Hungarian settlements in Slovakia on the border.

Its Hungarian name 'Örös' comes from the Hungarian name Örs although historical documents show the name to be 'Őrös'

Located in the village there is a reformed church. First recorded around 1700 as a wooden church however this church was later destroyed, thestone church located on this site was built in 1806 however it was burnt down 35 years later in 1841 and major reconstruction did not start until 1877 and end until 1894. A renovation started in 1935 and has been a functioning place of worship ever since.

References 
http://telepulesek.adatbank.sk/telepules/oros-strazne/
https://web.archive.org/web/20121130174508/http://www.reformata.sk/?page=congr_145

Košice Region